The .250-3000 Savage (also known as the .250 Savage) is a rifle cartridge created by Charles Newton in 1915. It was designed to be used in the Savage Model 99 hammerless lever action rifle. The name comes from its original manufacturer, Savage Arms, and the fact that the original load achieved a 3,000 ft/s (910 m/s) velocity with an 87 grain (5.6 g) bullet.

Background
Charles Newton designed the .250-3000 Savage case to fit the popular Savage Model 99 lever-action rifle, which unlike the previous lever actions had no problems with aerodynamic spitzer bullets thanks to its rotary magazine. To facilitate handloading, casing geometry was based on .30-06 Springfield, albeit shortened in order to fit into the aforementioned magazine designed for .303 Savage. Newton recommended loading 100 grain (6.5 g) bullets at 2800 ft/s (850 m/s); but Savage Arms reduced bullet weight to obtain a velocity of 3,000 ft/s (910 m/s), making it the first American cartridge capable of that velocity. Achieving that velocity may have been the reason for the choice of the light-for-caliber 87-grain (5.6 g) bullet.  Newton questioned if the publicity advantages of velocity compensated for reduced penetration of the lighter bullet in larger game animals.

The cartridge has a pressure limit of 45,000 CUP set by SAAMI.  It lacks the power of the bigger .25-06 Remington but provides less noise and less recoil. Performance is very close to the .257 Roberts. Arguably it is a better overall cartridge for hunting than the more popular .30-30, but in recent years has lost ground to the .257 Roberts and flatter-shooting 6mm cartridges such as the .243 Winchester.

Currently, there are very few new firearms being made in .250 Savage. It is an excellent cartridge with moderate recoil for hunting small game on up to deer-sized game.

Variants
Some varmint hunters use the improved version of this cartridge, known as the .250 Ackley, .250 Improved or .250 Ackley Improved as a dual-purpose intermediate-range cartridge. The .250 Ackley is the same basic cartridge with a steeper shoulder and with the sides blown-out or straightened to increase powder space. This provides a velocity improvement of more than 250 ft/s (76.2 m/s) over standard factory loads.

See also
.25-06 Remington
 List of rifle cartridges
 Table of handgun and rifle cartridges

References

External links
 https://www.rifleshootermag.com/editorial/250-300-savage-history/454661
 https://www.americanrifleman.org/content/the-little-savage-250-3000

Pistol and rifle cartridges
Savage Arms